Emmanuel Sarpong (born 5 November 1971 in Ghana) is a Ghanaian retired professional footballer who is last known to have featured for Sarawak FA of the Malaysia Super League in 2003.

England

Was a trialist for Dagenham & Redbridge in 2002.

Malaysia

Cleared to represent Sarawak FA in competitions in 2003, Sarpong debuted in a league encounter with Pahang FA but had a proclivity for fouling, picking up five yellow cards his first five appearances with coach Jalil Ramli telling him to "take it easy". He then suffered a thigh injury and had to pass a fitness test before returning in time for the encounter with Perlis FA. However, the Ghanaian made a few costly errors in the first leg of the Malaysia Cup quarter-final which allowed Perak FA to win 2–0, causing him to be benched in the second leg before leaving by November.

References

External links 
 GhanaWeb Profile

1971 births
Living people
Expatriate footballers in Malaysia
Association football defenders
Sarawak FA players
Ghanaian footballers
Expatriate footballers in England
Expatriate footballers in Belgium
Association football forwards
K.V.C. Westerlo players
Ghanaian expatriate footballers
Ghanaian expatriate sportspeople in England
Heybridge Swifts F.C. players